The Wichí are an indigenous people of South America. They are a large group of tribes ranging about the headwaters of the Bermejo River and the Pilcomayo River, in Argentina and Bolivia.

Notes on designation
This ethnic group was named by the English settlers and is still widely known as Mataco. The etymology of the term is obscure but in several sources, it is cited that the Wichí find the term derogatory.  Among the group exists a folk etymology for this term, which relates it to the Spanish verb matar, to kill.  Thus their preferred name, their own word for themselves, is Wichí, pronounced , and their language, Wichí Lhamtés .

There is a pronunciation variant in some areas of Bolivia, where the self-denomination of the group is Weenhayek wichi, translated by Alvarsson (1988) as "the different people" (pl. Weenhayey). Weenhayey informers of Alvarsson state that the old name was Olhamelh, meaning simply us. The subgroups within Wichí have been identified and received different names in literature: Nocten or Octenay in Bolivia, Véjos or (perhaps more properly) Wejwus or Wehwos for the Western subgroup(s), and Güisnay for the Eastern subgroups of Argentina. The latter corresponds to Tewoq-lhelej, "the river people".

Population
At present, a number of Wichí groups can be found in Argentina and Bolivia, distributed as follows:

 Argentina:
18 groups in the north-west of Chaco, about 180 km north-west of the town of Castelli.
Many communities in Formosa, departments of Bermejo (15 communities), Matacos (10 communities), Patiño (7 communities) and Ramón Lista (33 communities).
Other communities are located in Salta, departments of San Martín (21 communities), Rivadavia (57 communities, some of them with just a few individuals), Orán, Metán (2 communities) and Anta (3 communities), being the latter three more isolated; and in Jujuy, departments of Santa Bárbara, San Pedro and Ledesma.
 Bolivia: Gran Chaco province, Tarija Department, on the Pilcomayo River, 14 communities living in the area from (and including) the town of Villa Montes up to D'Orbigny, in the Argentine border.

Ethnologue reports:
 Wichí Lhamtés Güisnay/Pilcomayo Wichí:  speakers in Argentina (2021)
 Wichí Lhamtés Nocten:  speakers in Bolivia (2012)
 Wichí Lhamtés Vejoz/Bermejo Wichí:  speakers in Argentina (2021)

Languages

Wichi are the most widely spoken languages of the Matacoan language family, and include three languages:
Wichí Lhamtés Vejoz
Wichí Lhamtés Güisnay
Wichí Lhamtés Nocten.

The total number of speakers can only be estimated; no reliable figures exist. Comparing several sources, the most probable number is from 40 to 50,000 individuals. The Argentine National Institute of Statistics and Censuses (INDEC) gives a figure of 36,135 for Argentina only. 
In Rosario, the third biggest city of Argentina, there's a community of about 10,000 wichi people, all of them fluent in whichi, and some native speakers. There are even a couple of bilingual primary schools.

For Bolivia, Alvarsson estimated between 1,700 and 2,000 speakers in 1988; a census reported 1,912, and Diez Astete & Riester (1996) estimated between 2,300 and 2,600 Weenhayek in sixteen communities.

According to Najlis (1968) and Gordon (2005), three main dialects can be distinguished in the Wichí group: southwestern or Vejós (Wehwós), northeastern or Güisnay (Weenhayek) and northwestern or Nocten (Oktenay). Tovar (1981) and other authors claim the existence of only two dialects (northeastern and southwestern), while Braunstein (1992-3) identifies eleven ethnical subgroups.

The Wichí language is predominantly suffixing and polysynthetic; verbal words have between 2 and 15 morphemes. Alienable and inalienable possession is distinguished. The phonological inventory is large, with simple, glottalized  and aspirated stops and sonorants. The number of vowels varies with dialect (five or six).
The Anglican Church, and particularly Bishop David Leake and his missionary father Alfred Leake before him, has played a crucial role in finding a written form for the Wichí language to record their stories and foundational myths.  Many Wichí people are christian, and Bishop Leake with the support of the Bible Society, translated the entire old and New Testaments into written form for the Wichí to read and hear it in their own language.

History
Much of the information available about the history of the Wichí comes from Jesuit and Franciscan missionaries of the 17th and 18th centuries. The first mission came in 1690, but it was unsuccessful. In 1771 the Franciscan Mission of Zenta found a better reception. However, with the decline of the Spanish power these missions also fell into decay.  The Anglican Church has been heavily involved with the Wichí and Toba people since the beginning of the 20th Century.  There are currently over 140 churches across the local area which are almost exclusively attended by indigenous families.  Many of the priests of the Anglican Church in Northern Argentina are from the indigenous communities, and three of the Bishops of the (Anglican) Diocese of Northern Argentina are from indigenous communities including the Wichí (cf. Diocese of Northern Argentina; Anglican Indigenous Network).

The Wichí territory does seem to have changed since the 18th century, when the first precise information on their existence and location were known. Their neighbors in the Pilcomayo River area were the Toba, and their lands on the Bermejo River extended from the current town of Embarcación, Salta, to a region north of current town of Castelli in the Chaco Province.  The Anglican Diocese of Northern Argentina has advocated on behalf of the Wichí people for over a century mediating between the local governments of Formosa and Salta to try and secure land rights of the indigenous populations - for over half a century the Anglican Church was privately purchasing some of these lands to allow the indigenous people to live there while the National Government refused to acknowledge land rights (or human rights).  In February 2020 the InterAmerican Court of Human Rights ruled against the Government of Argentina in a landmark Case and ordered reparations and restitution of land and fishing rights to the indigenous communities.  ASOCIANA, an ecological charity under the umbrella of the Anglican Church, has been heavily involved in this process and of documenting ecological crimes committed by private corporations and governments groups.

According to Father Alejandro Corrado, a Franciscan of Tarija, the Wichí were nomadic; their houses were light structures scattered in the jungle. Corrado claims the Wichí lived chiefly upon fish and algarroba, that is, the fruit of the local algarrobo tree (usually identified with Prosopis alba or South American mesquite), as well as honey-locust, but "they ate anything that was not poisonous, even rats and grasshoppers". From the algarroba they were said to prepare an intoxicating liquor (this is probably aloja, produced by fermentation of the sugar-loaded patay paste inside the fruit). The ripening of the algarroba was celebrated by a ceremony.

Also in Corrado's words, among the Wichí "everything is in common". He claimed that there was a division of tasks, the men occupying themselves with fishing or occasional hunting with bow or club, and the women doing practically all the other work.

As for religious belief, Corrado wrote that the Wichí medicine men fight off disease "with singing and rattle", that the Wichí believe in a good spirit and a bad spirit, and that the soul of the deceased is reincarnated in an animal. There is old evidence of the use of the entheogen Anadenanthera colubrina by Wichi shamans in Argentina.

The Pentecostal Church of Sweden started working within the Wichí community in the early parts of the last century which resulted in that a vast majority of the Weenhayek's are Christians. The fact that the terms of possessions and ownership does not exist within the community has made this conversion quite easy. Everyone owns everything (and nothing) together just as the Bible talks about was the case with the first churches as well. There are other facts that has helped the contextualisation of the gospel, like the Weenhayek being fishermen (in the Pilcomayo River ) just as some of the disciples of the bible. These facts has made it possible for the Weenhayek to maintain their unique cultural identity and traditions in spite of also embracing faith in Christianity.

Current threats
Wichí have traditionally lived from hunting, fishing and basic agriculture. Since the beginning of the 20th century, significant portions of their traditional land have been taken over by outsiders, and what was once a grassland became desertified by deforestation, introduction of cattle and, more recently, by the introduction of alien crops (soybean). A study made in 1998 by a graduate student from Clark University, Worcester, MA based on satellite photo surveys showed that between 1984 and 1996 20% of the forest has been lost.

The Wichí were affected by the recession that lasted from 1999 to 2002, but their relative economic self-sufficiency, their physical isolation and the lack of recognition on the part of the authorities largely diminished the impact of the crisis, which was circumscribed on inflation in the price of certain goods they cannot produce (such as sugar and red meat, replaceable by wild honey and fish) and on problems with the supply of medicines and healthcare.

For many years, the Wichí have been struggling to get legal titles to the land they traditionally own, constantly seized and fenced by non-indigenous cattlers and farmers. Their main claims are centered in two large public land areas in eastern Salta, known as Lote 55 (about 2,800 km²) and Lote 14. The Wichí rights to that land have been recognised by law, but no practical enforcement actions have been taken by the Salta provincial government.

At the beginning of 2004, the government of Salta decided to lift the protected status of the General Pizarro Natural Reserve, an area of 250 km² in the Anta Department inhabited by about 100 Wichí, and sell part of the land to two private companies, Everest SA and Initium Aferro SA, to be deforested and planted with soybean. After months of complaints, legal struggle, and a campaign sponsored by Greenpeace, on 29 September 2005 (after an exposure in a popular TV show) a group of Argentine artists, actors, musicians, models, environmental groups and Wichí representatives arranged a hearing with Chief of Cabinet Alberto Fernández, Director of the National Parks Administration Héctor Espina and President Néstor Kirchner himself. The national government promised to discuss the matter with Salta governor Juan Carlos Romero.

On 14 October 2005 the National Parks Administration and the government of Salta signed an agreement to create a new national protected area in General Pizarro. Of the approximately 213 km² comprised by the new reserve, the Wichí will have the right of use of 22 km², and they will own 8 km².

El Chaco, where Wichí also live, is the largest subtropical dry broadleaf forest of the earth. Currently, the Wichí and other indigenous groups are in danger of losing their land and livelihood to agrobusinesses. Soy and cotton farmers want to cut the trees in order to expand cultivation. The Chaco forest is being cut down six times faster than the Amazon jungle. The greatest profiteers are logging companies. Additionally, soy cultivation has accelerated deforestation. In a lot of cases this also means, that the indigenous communities lose their land to agrobusinesses and suffer under the intense use of fertilizers and pesticides, that poisons the water they depend on. Since 2008, many indigenous people are organised in the “Movimiento Nacional Campesino Indígena” (National Movement of Indigenous Peasants) and fight for the legal right to their land.

Wichí society
Wichí, as other hunter-gatherer peoples, were semi-nomadic. Even today and despite transculturation, there is a fairly large number of montaraces (nomadic) communities or clans. Each Wichí village has its own territory, but usually a few communities share the use of the overlapping areas. Each community consists of one or more clans. Wichi society is matrilocal, i.e., people belong to their mothers' clans; upon marriage, men move to their wives' villages. Individuals and families of some of the neighboring peoples like the Iyojwaja (Chorote), Nivaklé, Qomlek (Toba) and Tapy'y (Tapieté) often live amongst the Wichí, sometimes marrying into their society.

They build small mud houses with roofs made of leaves and branches, well adapted to the high temperatures of summer that can reach 50 °C (120 °F). During the dry season (winter) they depend on fishing in the Bermejo and Pilcomayo rivers, and cultivate corn, pumpkins, beans and watermelons during summer. Throughout the year the Wichí hunt deers (Cervidae) like "guasuncho" (Mazama goauzoubira) and "corzuela roja" (Mazama americana), armadillos (Dasypus, Tolypeutes and Euphractus genii), rabbits ("tapetí", Sylvilagus brasiliensis), several types of iguana and peccaries (Tayassu albirostris, Tayassu tajacu); search for wild honey and gather fruits. For centuries they have used the strong fibers of chaguar (Bromelia serra, Bromelia hieronymi) for weaving nets, purses and other textile objects; some communities base a substantial part of their economy in selling chaguar handicrafts.

The most popular game among the Wichí is a team sport called `yaj ha`lä, which resembles lacrosse. Games usually last from dawn to dusk without interruption, and are agreed between clans. The magical significance of the game is lost, but it is still a subject of heavy gambling: rival clans bet animals, clothes, seeds and horses on the outcome of the game.

Notes

References

 Adelaar, Willem F.H., (2004). The languages of the Andes. Cambridge: Cambridge University Press
 Alvarsson, Jan-Åke. (1988). The Mataco of the Gran Chaco: an ethnographic account of change and continuity in Mataco socio-economic organization. Stockholm: Almqvist & Wiksell International (Uppsala Studies in Cultural Anthropology, 11).
 Braunstein, José A., 1992-3. "Presentación: esquema provisorio de las tribus chaqueñas". Hacia una Nueva Carta Étnica del Gran Chaco, 4: 1-8. Las Lomitas, Formosa.
 De la Cruz, Luis María, (1990). Grupos aborígenes de Formosa. Localización e identidad étnica (map).
 
 Díez Astete, Álvaro and Jürgen Riester, (1995). "Etnias y territorios indígenas". In Kathy Mihotek (ed.), Comunidades, territorios indígenas y biodiversidad en Bolivia. Santa Cruz de la Sierra: UAGRM-Banco Mundial.
 
 
 
 Terraza, Jimena, (2001). "Towards a language planning of the endangered languages in Argentina: the case of Wichí in the Southwest of the Province of Salta". Symposium Linguistic Perspectives on Endangered Languages, Helsinki University, Aug.29 to Sep.1, 2001.
 

 See also 

 Hamilton's Pharmacopeia

External links

 Wichi language (research, documentation and education in Argentina)
 Wichi Vocabulary List (from the World Loanword Database)
 Comparative Wichi Swadesh vocabulary list (from Wiktionary's Swadesh list appendix)
 
 INDEC National Institute of Statistics and Censuses of Argentina.
 Grupo Sacham
 Chacolinks - Support for the Wichi people of Argentina (reports on the conservation of the language, culture, lands, etc. of the Wichí)
 To Argentina's Wichi, economic collapse means little, from Latin American Studies; taken from The Washington Times, August 13, 2002.
 Survival 2002, a report on current threats to the Wichí's rights.
 The Art of Being Wichi, a Norwegian film that is currently being made on the Wichi Indians by Corax Videoproduksjon as.
 Greenpeace. 22 August 2005. Burning of forest lands in Salta (picture gallery).
 About the General Pizarro Natural Reserve:
 Fundación Ambiente y Recursos Naturales. Programa Control Ciudadano del Medio Ambiente. Caso: Desafectación de Reserva Provincial General Pizarro (provincia de Salta). Greenpeace. July 2005. Razones por las que no debe destruirse la Reserva de Pizarro (Salta). Biodiversidad en América Latina. Argentina: la Reserva de Pizarro a punto de desaparecer. 26 September 2005.
 Página/12 newspaper, 30 September 2005. El reclamo wichí llegó a la Rosada. Página/12 newspaper, 15 October 2005. La reconquista de Pizarro.''
  Scholarly paper: Hufty, M. (2008). Pizarro Protected Area: A political ecology perspective on land use, soybeans and Argentina’s nature conservation policy.

Indigenous peoples of the Gran Chaco
Indigenous peoples in Bolivia
Indigenous peoples in Argentina
Indigenous peoples in Chile